The Isiolo Massacre refers collectively to a series of massacres of ethnic Somalis by Kenyan security personnel in the 1960s in Isiolo County, Kenya.

Massacre
During the Shifta War in the 1960s, civilians of the Kenyan Somali community were murdered by government soldiers, including the 1967 killing of 18 elders in the Isiolo Mosque during prayer time at around noon. There were an estimated 2,700 Somali Kenyans killed Isiolo County at the hand of Kenyan security forces.

References 

1960s in Kenya
Massacres in 1967
Isiolo County
Massacres in Kenya
Jomo Kenyatta
Ethnic Somali people